Khnkavan or Khangutala is a village that is, de facto, in the Martakert Province of the breakaway Republic of Artsakh; de jure, it is in the Kalbajar District of Azerbaijan, in the disputed region of Nagorno-Karabakh. The village has an ethnic Armenian-majority population, and also had an Armenian majority in 1989.

History 
During the Soviet period, the village was part of the Mardakert District of the Nagorno-Karabakh Autonomous Oblast.

Economy and culture 
The population is mainly engaged in agriculture and animal husbandry. As of 2015, the village has a municipal building, the Khnkavan branch of the Vaghuhas Secondary School, and a medical centre.

Demographics 
The village had 169 inhabitants in 2005, and 193 inhabitants in 2015.

References

External links 
 
 

Populated places in Martakert Province
Populated places in Kalbajar District
Abolished villages in Kalbajar District